Adédayọ̀ is both a surname and a given name of Yoruba origin, meaning "the crown or royalty became joyful". Notable people with the name include:

Adelayo Adedayo (born 1988), British actress
Adedayo Adebayo (born 1970), Nigerian rugby union player
Adedayo Clement Adeyeye (born 1957), Nigerian politician
Adedayo Omolafe (1964–2021), Nigerian politician

Yoruba given names
Yoruba-language surnames